Natalie Babonyová (born October 22, 1983) is a Canadian female ice hockey forward. Babonyova participated in the 2010 Vancouver Winter Games for Slovakia.

Born in Oshawa, Ontario, and raised in Canada as the daughter of Slovak immigrants. When not playing for the Slovakian national team, she plays for the Toronto Crush in a women's league in the Greater Toronto Area

Playing career
She was part of the Slovakian roster that defeated Bulgaria by an 82-0 score in September 2008 in the Olympic Pre-Qualification tournament in Latvia.
 
In 2009, she competed in the 2009 IIHF World Women’s Championship Division I, which was played in Graz, Austria. She was part of the Slovak team that qualified for the top division of the 2011 World Women's Championships.

Babonyova competed for Slovakia at a Four Nations Tournament in Europe during December 2010. The tournament was contested in Romanshorn, Switzerland. Babonyova scored two goals as Slovakia finished second behind the Swiss.

Vancouver Winter Games
She played for Slovakia in the 2010 Olympics. It was the first time that Slovakia competed in women's ice hockey outside of Europe. Her first Olympic women's ice hockey game came on February 13, 2010, against the team representing the country of her birth, Canada. Slovakia lost the game by an 18-0 mark and Babonyova was penalized for cross checking in the second period. Her first Olympic point came on February 15 in a 6-2 loss to Sweden. She finished the Olympic tournament with an eighth place finish.

Career statistics

Winter Olympics

References

1983 births
Living people
Canadian people of Slovak descent
Ice hockey players at the 2010 Winter Olympics
Olympic ice hockey players of Slovakia
Sportspeople from Oshawa
Slovak women's ice hockey forwards
Canadian women's ice hockey forwards
Ice hockey people from Ontario